"Missing Words" is a song and single written by Neol Davies and performed by English 2 tone ska revival band the Selecter. Released in 1980 it reached #23, on the UK charts, staying there for eight weeks.

Background
In contrast to the Selecter's two previous singles, "On My Radio" and "Three Minute Hero", "Missing Words" is a downbeat song about heartbreak issued as the 2 Tone Records ska revival began to fade.

References

External links

1980 singles
1980 songs
The Selecter songs
2 Tone Records singles
Songs written by Neol Davies